(died October 17, 1624), formerly known as , , , was an aristocrat and Buddhist nun, founder of the temple Kōdai-ji in Kyoto, Japan. When she rose in higher political status, she took the title of "Kita no mandokoro". As the matriarch figure of the Toyotomi clan, she led all diplomatic affairs that had to do with the imperial court, and monitored the daimyos' families who were being held hostage at Osaka Castle.

Early life
Kōdai-in was born in Owari Province between 1541 and 1549. She was adopted by her maternal uncle Asano Nagakatsu, a descendant of the Toki clan, of Minamoto no Yorimitsu (944-1021), and the Emperor Seiwa (850-881). According to the "Hankanpu" (Genealogy of the Protectors of the Shogunate), she was first supposed to marry Maeda Toshiie, but she became the wife of Hideyoshi.

As Hideyoshi's wife
Around 1561, she married Hashiba Hideyoshi, a man who would later become one of the three great unifiers of Japan, although at the time of their marriage he had yet to gain much fame, and despite her mother Asahi-dono's opposition to this marriage, because of the difference in social status with her husband. Nene was his principal wife and also one of his favorite wives.  In 1585, after Hideyoshi was appointed to the post of Imperial Regent (Kampaku), Nene took on the title of "Kita no mandokoro."

As the wife of Hideyoshi, Nene is most famous for being one of his closest aides and confidantes. The daughter of a samurai, she had many familial connections that netted Hideyoshi several retainers. Among these retainers were Sugihara Ietsugu (Nene's uncle), Kinoshita Iesada (Nene's brother), Kobayakawa Hideaki (Nene's nephew) and Asano Nagamasa (Nene's brother-in-law). The last of these characters would serve as an important official in Hideyoshi's later administration.  Nene was known to have been an intelligent woman who, at times, advised Hideyoshi on matters of governance by sending him letters. When Hideyoshi repealed the tax exemptions he had granted to the residents living in his headquarters at Nagahama, Nene appealed to him to reinstate the exemptions, and he did. It is also recorded that Hideyoshi frequently wrote letters to Nene to tell her about how his campaigns were going. Hideyoshi did this after his invasion of Sassa Narimasa's territory in Japan's Hokuriku region and after his campaign against the Shimazu clan.

When Hideyoshi unified Japan, Nene often went with him to attend parties. She was courteous and respectful to her guests on every occasion. When Emperor Go-Yozei visited Hideyoshi's mansion with his entourage in 1588, Nene freely distributed a plethora of gifts to Hideyoshi's visitors. She also received the rank of Juichii from the Emperor himself. During Japanese invasions of Korea, Nene assisted the Toyotomi army by giving advise on how to transfer supplies from Japan to Korea.

Though adored, Nene often found herself competing with other women for Hideyoshi's attention. In a letter to Nene, Oda Nobunaga also noted that Hideyoshi was somewhat dissatisfied with Nene. Hideyoshi took up several concubines.  Nene did not bear any children.

Letter from Oda Nobunaga

...It has been quite sometime since I last saw you, but your beauty grows day by day. Tokichiro [Hideyoshi] complains about you constantly and it is outrageous. While that "bald rat" [Hideyoshi] flusters to find another good woman, you remain lofty and elegant. Do not be envious. Show Hideyoshi this letter...

As Hideyoshi's widow

Nene worried about Hideyoshi often when he was on his deathbed. Eventually, as Hideyoshi was on his last throes, she petitioned the Imperial Court to sponsor a sacred dance ritual to pray for and expedite Hideyoshi's recovery.

After Hideyoshi died in 1598, Nene became a nun and assumed the dharma name of Kōdai-in Kogetsuni. She was respected as a maternal figure for many retainers of the Toyotomi clan who proved to be loyal to her even after Hideyoshi's death. She gave up the eastern ward of Osaka Castle to Tokugawa Ieyasu and relocated herself to the imperial palace. Nene had a captivating and gentle personality, so she gained the respect of many; she helped and housed many women related to the Western Army (commanded by Ishida Mitsunari) after the Battle of Sekigahara.

In 1602, after the Battle of Sekigahara, she had an audience with the mother of Tokugawa Ieyasu, Odai no Kata and Emperor Goyozei.

In 1603, Nene attended Toyotomi Hideyori and Senhime's wedding. In 1606 with the help of Tokugawa Ieyasu, she established a Buddhist temple Kōdai-ji in Kyoto, to which she moved. It became the burial area for her husband, his mother, and later Toyotomi Hideyori. During the contest between Toyotomi Hideyori and Tokugawa Ieyasu for supremacy (Siege of Osaka), Kōdai-in took the side of Ieyasu.

Death
After her death in 1624 and burial within the temple compound, she was posthumously given the name of Hikari no Tenshi or "Angel of Light".

Her remains would later be unearthed to make way for the sanctuary known as Otama-ya. Upon its completion, her remains was interred in there, placed under the wooden statue of herself, alongside the statue of Hideyoshi.

Legacy
The life of this prominent resident of Kyoto is still commemorated in a short street which bears her name.  remains lined with structures built in traditional Kyoto style.  Nene-no-Michi is located in Higashiyama Ward in eastern Kyoto near Kōdai-ji, Maruyama Park and Yasaka Shrine.

Mikazuki Munechika (sword)
Sword made by Sanjō Munechika (三条宗近), One of the Five Swords under Heaven (天下五剣); the name "Mikazuki (三日月)", meaning "crescent moon" refers to the shape of the tempering pattern; owned by Kōdai-in, wife of Toyotomi Hideyoshi who bequeathed it to Tokugawa Hidetada, then handed down in the Tokugawa clan.

Honours
Junior First Rank (April 19, 1588)

See also
List of female castellans in Japan
People of the Sengoku period in popular culture.

References

Further reading
 Berry, Mary Elizabeth. (1982).  Hideyoshi. Cambridge: Harvard University Press.  
 Nenz Detto Nenzi, Laura. (2008).  Excursions in Identity: Travel and the Intersection of Place, Gender, and Status in Edo Japan. Honolulu: University of Hawai'i Press. 
 Rowthorn, Chris. (2005).  Kyoto: City Guide. Melbourne: Lonely Planet.     OCLC: 224361206
 Yoshikawa, Eiji. (1992). Taiko: An Epic Novel of War and Glory in Feudal Japan. Tokyo: Kodansha International.  (cloth)
 _. (2000).  Taiko: An Epic Novel of War and Glory in Feudal Japan. Tokyo: Kodansha International.  (cloth)

1540s births
1624 deaths
16th-century Japanese people
17th-century Japanese people
16th-century Japanese women
17th-century Japanese women
Japanese Buddhist clergy
People of Sengoku-period Japan
Women of medieval Japan
16th-century women politicians
Japanese Buddhist nuns
16th-century Buddhist nuns
17th-century Buddhist nuns